Herbert Irving Schiller (November 5, 1919 – January 29, 2000) was an American media critic, sociologist, author, and scholar.  He earned his PhD in 1960 from New York University.

Schiller warned of two major trends in his prolific writings and speeches: the private takeover of public space and public institutions at home, and U.S. corporate domination of cultural life abroad, especially in the developing nations. His eight books and hundreds of articles in both scholarly and popular journals made him a key figure both in communication research and in the public debate over the role of the media in modern society. He was widely known for the term “packaged consciousness,” that argues American media is controlled by a few corporations that “create, process, refine and preside over the circulation of images and information which determines our beliefs, attitudes and ultimately our behavior.” Schiller used Time Warner Inc. as an example of packaged consciousness, stating that it “basically dominates publishing, cable television, recordings, tapes and filmmaking.”

He was married to librarian and scholar Anita Schiller, and their children include sons Zach and Dan.  Zach Schiller is a public policy analyst in Ohio, and Dan Schiller is a telecommunications historian at the University of Illinois at Urbana-Champaign.

Writings
 Mass Communications and American Empire (1969)
 Mind Managers (1973)
 The Ideology of International Communications (Monograph Series / Institute for Media Analysis, Inc, No. 4)
 Mass Communications and American Empire (Critical Studies in Communication and in the Cultural Industries)
 Super-state; readings in the military-industrial complex
 Communication and Cultural Domination (1976)
 Living in the Number One Country : Reflections from a Critic of American Empire
 Who Knows : Information in the Age of the Fortune 500 (1981)
 Information and the Crisis Economy, Oxford University Press (1984), Oxford University Press, Reprint 1986, 
 Culture, Inc.: The Corporate Takeover of Public Expression, Oxford University Press, 1989, ; Reprint 1996,  
 Information Inequality: The Deepening Social Crisis in America, Routledge 1995,

Secondary literature
Richard Maxwell: Herbert Schiller (Critical Media Studies), Rowman & Littlefield, 2003,

External links

 UCSD Department of Communication
 The Packaged Consciousness
 Biography of Herbert Schiller
 The Information Superhighway: Paving Over the Public. Interview with Herbert Schiller from Z Magazine, March 1994
 Understanding Information Media in the Age of Neoliberalism:  The Contributions of Herbert Schiller
 Noted UC San Diego Communication Scholar, Media Critic Herb Schiller Dies
 Public Information as a Function of Private Profit The Open Mind (1991)
 Freedom of the Press or Cultural Imperialism The Open Mind (1979)

References 

1919 births
2000 deaths
American media critics
Communication theorists
20th-century American non-fiction writers